"A Return to Normalcy" is the 12th episode of the first season of HBO television series Boardwalk Empire and the season finale, which premiered on HBO December 5, 2010. The episode was written by series creator Terence Winter and directed by Tim Van Patten, both executive producers.

Nucky and Atlantic City brace for change on Election Day; Torrio brokers a deal between two rivals, with far-reaching consequences; Jimmy ponders his future, as does Margaret, Agent Van Alden, and Eli.

The title of the episode is a reference to the acceptance speech of President Warren G. Harding, which is featured on the show.

Plot
Van Alden has requested a transfer out of Atlantic City, although his supervisor asks him to reconsider. The Commodore's maid admits she tried to poison him because of his mistreatment. Nucky lets her leave Atlantic City quietly over the protests of the Commodore. Nucky is increasingly stressed about the election, which the Democrats stand a good chance of winning. Chalky offers to deliver the black vote for $10,000, a new car, and an invitiation to the (whites only) Election Night victory party.

Margaret and the children are staying with Nan Britton, who insists that Warren Harding will send for her when he becomes President. Margaret does not have the heart to tell her otherwise, but is preoccupied with taking care of the children and deciding whether to leave Atlantic City.

Rothstein is about to leave for Chicago to escape an indictment for fixing the 1919 World Series when Luciano and Lansky suggest setting up a meeting with Nucky to end the war. At a meeting brokered by Johnny Torrio, Nucky agrees to end the war and use his political connections to quash the indictment for $1 million in cash and the location of the D'Alessio brothers. As Nucky calls a press conference blaming the D'Alessios for the robbery of Rothstein's shipment, Jimmy, Richard Harrow, and Al murder the gang.

Margaret discovers Nucky had a son who died shortly after childbirth. After talking with him, she becomes convinced he is kind at heart. Jimmy describes his life in the trenches to Angela, and the two agree to go back to the happier times before the war. However, when she receives a postcard from Paris, she cuts her long hair that Jimmy was so fond of, disappointing him. Van Alden, who vowed to leave Atlantic City unless he received a sign from God, learns from Lucy that she is pregnant.

On election night, Bader is elected. His first decision as Mayor is to reinstate Eli as sheriff, per Nucky's wishes and to Halloran's visible disappointment. Spoiling the celebration, a drunken Jimmy confronts Nucky, accusing him of pimping out his mother to the Commodore. At the Election night party, Margaret and Nucky reunite before Harding wins the Presidential election, while at his mansion, the Commodore reveals to Jimmy his plan to dethrone Nucky with the help of Eli.

The end montage shows the characters contemplating their decisions and futures. Margaret and Nucky leave the celebration and stand out on the boardwalk, gazing out towards the ocean as the sun rises.

Reception

Critical response
IGN gave the episode a score of 8.5. The website said, "As Harding's victory speech calls for a return to normalcy, despite Margaret back in his life, Nucky is poised to return to anything but. 'Every one of us must decide how much sin we can live with.' The amount Nucky has chosen for himself threatens to bite him in the ass, despite the episode's 'happy' ending. For Boardwalk to raise the bar it's already placed quite high, this consequence thing will have to get more play in a second season. For the only thing that can be better than Nucky getting away 'fast, [and] totally devoid of any emotion' is watching him squirm when there are no clean getaways."

Ratings
The season finale rose two tenths of a point a 1.3 adults 18–49 rating, and added about 300,000 viewers vs. last week. "A Return to Normalcy" had a viewership of 3.294 million.

References

External links 
 "A Return to Normalcy" at HBO
 

Boardwalk Empire episodes
2010 American television episodes
Television episodes directed by Tim Van Patten
Television episodes written by Terence Winter